Willa O'Neill is an actress from New Zealand.

Biography 
O'Neill is a two-time Film Award winner at the New Zealand Film and TV Awards. Her first award, for Best Supporting Actress, came for her role in the 1997 film Topless Women Talk About Their Lives. Her second win was for Best Actress  in the 1999 film Scarfies.

After her final film appearance in The Price of Milk, O'Neill settled down into marriage and family life.

Filmography

Film

Television

Awards

Wins
2000 AFI Award, for Scarfies
1997 NZ Film and TV Award, for Topless Women Talk About Their Lives

Nominations
1992 NZ Film and TV Award, for Secrets

References

External links
 

People from Auckland
New Zealand film actresses
New Zealand television actresses
New Zealand soap opera actresses
Living people
20th-century New Zealand actresses
21st-century New Zealand actresses
Year of birth missing (living people)